The Gir or Gyr is one of the principal Zebu breeds originating in India. It has been used locally in the improvement of other breeds including the Red Sindhi and the Sahiwal. It was also one of the breeds used in the development of the Brahman breed in North America.  In Brazil and other South American countries the Gir is used frequently because, as a Bos indicus breed, it is resistant to hot temperatures and tropical diseases.  It is well known for its milk producing qualities and is often bred with Friesian cows to make the Girolando breed.

The Gir is distinctive in appearance, typically having a rounded and domed forehead (being the only ultraconvex breed in the world), long pendulous ears and horns which spiral out and back. Gir are generally mottled with the colour ranging from red through yellow to white, black being the only unacceptable colour. They originated in west India in the state of Gujarat and have since spread to neighbouring Maharashtra and Rajasthan.

In 2010 the population in Brazil was estimated at approximately five million.

See also
 Hariana cattle
 Jersey cattle

References

External links 
 Gyr breed of Cattle 
 Associação Brasileira dos Criadores de Gir Leiteiro

Dairy cattle breeds
Cattle breeds originating in India
Animal husbandry in Gujarat
Cattle breeds